The Marriage Ref is an American reality television show and panel game hosted by comedian Tom Papa and produced by Jerry Seinfeld, in which a rotating group of celebrities decides the winners of real-life marital disputes. The show premiered on NBC on Sunday, February 28, 2010 on the final night of the Olympics before moving to Thursdays. The show's second season debuted on June 26, 2011.

On May 13, 2012, NBC cancelled the series after two seasons.

Premise
The premise of the show involves real-life couples who have been having an ongoing argument. In season one, a video clip was shown to a three-member celebrity panel depicting both sides of a dispute. The celebrities made humorous observations, deliberated the merits and voted on who should win the debate. Though the Marriage Ref (Papa) took their votes into consideration, he was free to make his own decision about who was right.

In addition to the celebrity panel, season one featured a fact checker who could provide additional information to aid in the decision making. Today correspondents Natalie Morales and Maria Menounos and MSNBC's Mika Brzezinski filled this role.

Changes have been announced for season two. In these episodes, couples will appear live in studio, and at the end of each show, the studio audience will vote on which of the night's three winners is "The Rightest." The winner will receive $25,000 and a billboard in their hometown declaring that they are right.

Reviewers have described the show as a renewal of the panel game format popular in classic American television.

Production
The Marriage Ref was originally scheduled to premiere Sunday, March 14 at 8 pm, as the lead-in to The Celebrity Apprentice. NBC greenlighted the show "within minutes" of Seinfeld pitching the concept. However, as a result of The Jay Leno Show being cancelled, the premiere was moved up to Thursday, March 4 at 10 pm, as one of its replacement shows.

The executive producers of The Marriage Ref are Jerry Seinfeld, Ellen Rakieten, Nick Emerson, Jennifer O'Connell, and Al Berman. Seinfeld selected comedian Tom Papa, his longtime warm-up act, to serve as the show's host and referee. The program is produced by Seinfeld's company, Columbus 81 Productions. Endemol provides services of international distribution of The Marriage Ref. Central Talent Booking manages the composition of each show's celebrity panel.

Episodes

Season 1 (2010)

Season 2 (2011)

Critical reception

Reviews
The Marriage Ref received an overwhelmingly negative reception from television critics. It currently receives a 41 out of 100 on Metacritic based on 11 reviews. According to the news agency, Reuters, the television program received "scathing reviews". An analysis of reviews in The Guardian noted that The Marriage Ref, "has been so thoroughly panned by critics its future looks in doubt even before it begins." A review of the program on National Public Radio called the television show "painfully bad"; the reviewer commented, "I was optimistic that I'd be writing something of the 'Don't assume this show is terrible' variety. But it's ... terrible." The newspaper The Star Ledger described it as "heinous", and called it an "ugly, unfunny, patronizing mess". The New York Times called the show "funny, despite a cheesy game show premise". A review by Entertainment Weekly called the program "silly fun", and commented, "The Marriage Ref exists to permit the celebrity judges to comment amusingly on the cases to be adjudicated." An analysis in Variety magazine characterized the program as "a breezy, inexpensive approach to comedy that brought to mind the panel shows of yesteryear". The Wall Street Journal characterized the show as a "panel" form of game show, commenting, "The concept is essentially a re-jiggering of a genre staple of television's halcyon days: the 'panel' game show".

A commentary on the show in Time magazine commented that The Marriage Ref was "the most God-awful mishmash of a comedy-variety show". Time gave it an F, as did The A.V. Club who noted how confused the premise of the show is claiming that the pilot "safely toe[s] the line between all of [its] options and never commit[s] to one of them." A reviewer for TV.com commented, "The Marriage Ref may be the worst television I've seen in awhile [sic]." The review concluded that the program was an "atrocity" and, "a pathetic half-hour that's edited to hell, results in meaningless resolutions, features the worst animated intro of all-time, and is just plain uncomfortable to watch".

"Who knew Seinfeld could be this unfunny?", commented a review in The Baltimore Sun; the review stated that the program was not worthy of its Thursday slot or daytime syndication. The Huffington Post asked a similar question, "How could a man as funny as Seinfeld produce such a remarkably unfunny show?" The website Gawker mused as to whether "Jerry Seinfeld's new show almost cancels out Seinfeld", and IGN wrote, "The Marriage Ref just felt utterly dead on arrival." New York Magazine characterized The Marriage Ref as "kinda terrible". An analysis of the show in The Hartford Courant wrote, "What do you do if you've managed to pull your network up from fourth place after two weeks of highly-rated Olympic Winter games? If you're NBC, you squander it immediately on an unfunny little thing called 'The Marriage Ref.'" The review concluded that "absolutely nothing funny happened", and called the show "about as wrongheaded an offering to prime time as, well, anything on NBC these days"

Ratings
In the ratings, the program's debut performed worse than the CBS Network television reality show Undercover Boss even with the Olympics closing lead-in. The pre-empting and tape delay of the remainder of the 2010 Winter Olympics closing ceremony after late local news in order to broadcast the premiere of The Marriage Ref was immediately criticized by viewers over social networking websites such as Twitter. The week after its debut, The Marriage Ref dropped to number three in the ratings; losing to the CBS program The Mentalist and the ABC Network program Private Practice. The program had been in first place in its first week, but fell 21 percent in the ratings in its second week. The program saw steady ratings decline with each episode since its debut. The first showing of The Marriage Ref had 14 million viewers, and by the fourth full episode the number of viewers had declined to 6.5 million. As of the fourth episode, the program had "posted its lowest rating to date", with a rating of 2.5/7. In the program's sixth broadcast, the April 8, 2010 edition of The Marriage Ref hit a season low with a rating of 2.1, just three days after it had been renewed for a second season.

The show's second season premiere had ratings 20% lower than the first season premiere, at a 1.6.

International versions

References

External links

American panel games
2010s American game shows
2010 American television series debuts
2010s American reality television series
2011 American television series endings
American dating and relationship reality television series
English-language television shows
NBC original programming
Television series created by Jerry Seinfeld